is an anime television series adaptation of the video game The Caligula Effect. It is produced by studio Satelight, and aired from April 8 to June 24, 2018.

Characters
The voice actors for the cast differ slightly from the game.

 The protagonist. In the video game, the protagonist does not have a name and can be either male or female.
μ (pronounced Mu)

Anime
FuRyu announced during a livestream presentation that The Caligula Effect was to be adapted into a television anime. It premiered in April 2018. The anime is directed by Junichi Wada at Satelight, with Touko Machida handled the series composition, Kenji Tanabe designed the characters based on Oguchi's original design, and Yasuharu Takanashi alongside Funta7, Tsukasa Masuko, Kenji Iwata, and RegaSound composed the music. The opening theme song is "Paradigm Box" by Chiharu Sawashiro and Shunsuke Takeuchi, while the ending theme song is "Hypno" by Minami Tanaka, Rie Murakawa, Ari Ozawa, and Rie Takahashi. The series ran for 12 episodes. Crunchyroll streamed the series. The series has been licensed for a North American physical release by Discotek Media.

Notes

References

External links
 

Anime television series based on video games
Crunchyroll anime
Discotek Media
Satelight
Tokyo MX original programming